Central Texas is a region in the U.S. state of Texas surrounding Austin and roughly bordered by San Saba to Bryan and San Marcos to Hillsboro. Central Texas overlaps with and includes part of the Texas Hill Country and corresponds to a physiographic section designation within the Edwards Plateau, in a geographic context.

Central Texas includes the Austin–Round Rock, Killeen-Temple-Fort Hood, Bryan–College Station, and Waco metropolitan areas.  The Austin–Round Rock and Killeen-Temple-Fort Hood areas are among the fastest-growing metropolitan areas in the state. The Greater Austin and Greater San Antonio areas are separated from each other by approximately  along Interstate 35. It is anticipated that both regions may form a new metroplex similar to Dallas and Fort Worth.  Some of the largest cities in the region are Austin, College Station, Killeen, Round Rock, and Waco. The largest U.S. Army installation in the country, Fort Hood, is located near Killeen.

Composition
The counties (in red) that are almost always included in the Central Texas region are:

Counties (in pink) that are sometimes included in the Central Texas region are:

Gallery

See also

 Edwards Plateau
 List of geographical regions in Texas
 Llano Estacado
 Texas Hill Country

References

Further reading

External links
 Fredericksburg, Texas Chamber of Commerce
 "Celebrate Diversity in Central Texas." Austin American-Statesman.

Great Plains
Physiographic sections
Regions of Texas